Chah Guraki (also Romanized as Chāh Gūrakī) is a village in Hana Rural District, Abadeh Tashk District, Neyriz County, Fars Province, Iran. At the 2006 census, its population was 29, in 8 families.

References 

Populated places in Abadeh Tashk County